Vellalore Lake is a lake in Coimbatore, Tamil Nadu. The lake is spread over an area of 90 acres.

Wildlife 
The lake is a breeding ground for spot-billed pelicans.

References 

Lakes of Coimbatore